Pettigrove is a surname. Notable people with the surname include:

Glen Pettigrove, American philosopher
Michelle Pettigrove (born 1966), Australian actress